Roachester is an unincorporated community in Warren County, Ohio, United States.

Demographics

History
An early variant name was "Salem". Roachester was platted in 1816, and named for James Roach, proprietor. A post office called Rochester was established in 1825, and remained in operation until 1853.

References

Unincorporated communities in Warren County, Ohio
Unincorporated communities in Ohio